Unit 88-9 (Kiyomizu Masahiro) is a glazed stoneware sculpture by contemporary Japanese potter and sculptor Kiyomizu Masahiro, also known by the professional art-name Kiyomizu Rokubei VIII. This piece is held in the collection of the Royal Ontario Museum in Toronto, Canada.

Kiyomizu Masahiro
Kiyomizu Masahiro (清水 柾博) was born in Kyoto on April 22, 1954. His father was the sculptor Kiyomizu Kyūbei (清水九兵衛), who in 1981 became the seventh head of the Kiyomizu pottery atelier and took the name Kiyomizu Rokubei VII.

Kiyomizu Masahiro graduated from Tokyo's Waseda University with a degree in architecture from the Faculty of Science and Engineering in 1979. Although he originally planned to pursue this field, but decided to follow in the family pottery tradition because it gave him "full control of the creative process from start to finish." He returned to Kyoto, where he continued his studies. He spent one year at the Kyoto Prefectural Ceramic Training Institute and another year at the Municipal Decorative Arts Institute in Kyoto.

In 1983, he became an official ceramist of the Kiyomizu family. In 2000, at age 46, he succeeded his father to become the eighth head of the Kiyomizu pottery studio. At this time he took the name Kiyomizu Rokubei VIII. Since then, he has attempted to combine the 240 plus years of tradition of his family kiln with his own unique avant-garde style.

He is currently an instructor of Contemporary Ceramics at the Kyoto University of Art and Design (京都造形芸術大学). He describes the goal of his classes as, "not simply to learn the techniques required to make ceramics, but to learn how to use those skills to produce a beautiful form, to create the form you want to express, to create a form corresponding to a specific image." A technique he favours is joining flat slabs of clay in extended forms, highlighting instead of hiding the process of their construction. He then makes cuts to weaken the structure, which results in distortions during firing.
   
Kiyomizu Rokubei VIII is a member of the International Academy of Ceramics, the Japan Society of Oriental Ceramic Studies (東洋陶磁学会) and the Ceramic Society of Japan (日本陶磁協会). In a 2004 survey conducted by Japanese art magazine Honoho Geijutsu to determine Japan's most important living ceramists, Kiyomizu tied for 23rd place in the popular vote. He was ranked 12th by curators, critics and art journalists.

Awards

Unit 88-9
Although the first heads of the Kiyomizu family concentrated on traditional, popular objects and designs, Rokubei VII and VIII "took a radical turn" to produce abstract, geometric three-dimensional pieces which are either purely decorative, or combine function with distinctive, unexpected form. His works have been described as "futuristic-looking" and as having "a very Cubist sensibility." Unit 88-9 fits in well with this characterization. It is a polyhedral piece of sculptural stoneware, with multiple flat and curved surfaces. The top surface is concave and, like every other surface, is lacerated. It is monochromatic, being entirely dark brown.

Other works
Rokubei VIII's pieces belong to the following collections:
British Museum 
National Art Museum of China 
Everson Museum of Art
Sèvres National Ceramics Museum
Kyoto Municipal Museum of Art
Crafts Gallery of the National Museum of Modern Art, Tokyo
National Museum of Art, Osaka
 
His large-scale 1972 steel sculpture Belt II stands in Paris' Museum of Outdoor Sculpture.

In 2005, he produced the ceramic art sculpture SKY RELATION - 2005 for the domestic terminal of Central Japan International Airport (中部国際空港).

See also
 Royal Ontario Museum
 Spring and autumn landscapes (Hara Zaishō) - painting in same gallery
 Female Ghost (Kunisada) - print in same gallery
 Fan print with two bugaku dancers (Kunisada) - print in same gallery
 Ichikawa Omezō as a Pilgrim and Ichikawa Yaozō as a Samurai (Toyokuni I) - print in same gallery
 Eijudō Hibino at Seventy-one (Toyokuni I) - Print in same gallery
 Bust portrait of Actor Kataoka Ichizō I (Gochōtei Sadamasu II) - print in same gallery
 View of Tempōzan Park in Naniwa (Gochōtei Sadamasu) - print in same gallery

Notes

References
Earle, Joe. Contemporary Clay: Japanese Ceramics for the New Century. Boston: MFA Publications, 2005. .
Gendai meiko shokunin jinmei jiten (現代名工・職人人名事典). "Kiyomizu Masahiro (清水柾博)," 134. Tokyo: Nichigai Asoshietsu, 1990.
Glo Code. "Belt II." Accessed May 26, 2013. http://glocode.com/fr/dir/PAR1.php
Go-jo chawanzaka. "作家紹介：清水六兵衛 (Artist Profile: Kiyomizu Rokubei)." Accessed May 28, 2013. http://www.gojo-chawanzaka.jp/sakka/kiyomizurokube/
Japanese Pottery Information Center. "Honoho Geijutsu Rankings, 2004: Voting for Japan's Top 20 Living Ceramists." Accessed May 27, 2013. http://www.e-yakimono.net/html/honoho-rankings-2004.html
古美術やかた (Kobijutsu yakata). "清水六兵衛　歴代(The successive generations of Kiyomizu Rokubee)." Accessed May 26, 2013. http://www.kyoto-yakata.net/info/arts_crafts/kiyomizu_rokubee.html
Kyoto University of Art and Design. "清水 六兵衞 (Kiyomizu Rokubey)." Accessed May 28, 2013. http://www.kyoto-art.ac.jp/t/message/ceramic/
Kyoto University of Art and Design. "清水 六兵衞（陶芸家）[Kiyomizu Rokubey (Ceramist)]." Accessed May 29, 2013. http://www.kyoto-art.ac.jp/info/teacher/detail.php?memberId=142
Spysee.jp."清水六兵衛 (Kiyomizu Rokubey)." Accessed May 29, 2013. https://web.archive.org/web/20090629033912/http://spysee.jp/?%E6%B8%85%E6%B0%B4%E5%85%AD%E5%85%B5%E8%A1%9B%2F1535238%2Fprofile%3Fref=top_card
The British Museum. "lid; incense-burner." Accessed May 27, 2013. https://www.britishmuseum.org/research/collection_online/collection_object_details.aspx?objectId=766045&partId=1&searchText=kiyomizu&matcult=15930&page=1
UBE Biennale '07. "Rokubey Kiyomizu." Accessed May 27, 2013. http://www.ube-museum.jp/exhibition/22/guide/05e.htm
Yellin, Robert. "The evolution of ceramic form." The Japan Times: April 11, 2001.

External links
http://images.rom.on.ca/public/index.php?function=record&action=uview&sid=npwqs6sn6cm2ku6509ln&ccid=6703&recid=3954&tbl=aa&id=17881&pid=5709 Image of Unit 88-9

Ceramic sculptures
Collections of the Royal Ontario Museum
Japanese sculpture